William Strum (born April 16, 1938 – died August 28, 2010) was an American curler from Superior, Wisconsin.

Strum was a three-time  and a five-time United States men's curling champion (1965, 1968, 1969, 1974, 1978).

He played in the 1988 Winter Olympics and at the 1992 Winter Olympics when curling was a demonstration sport. In 1988, the USA men's team finished in fourth place, in 1992 they won bronze medal.

Personal life
Strum attended Superior Central High School. He was a member of the Wisconsin National Guard and was a partner with Central Sheet Metal. He was also a member of Pilgrim Lutheran Church. He was married to Betty and had three children.

Awards
 United States Curling Association Hall of Fame:
 1989 (as curler);
 1994 (with all 1965 world champions team: skip Bud Somerville, second Al Gagne and lead Tom Wright).
 2017 (with all 1974 world champions team: skip Bud Somerville, third Bob Nichols and lead Tom Locken).
 2017 (with all 1978 world champions team: skip Bob Nichols, second Tom Locken and lead Bob Christman).

Teams

References

External links

Curling Superiority!: A History of Superior Wisconsin's Championship Curling Club - Google Books (p. 49)
Video: 

1938 births
2010 deaths
People from Bemidji, Minnesota
Sportspeople from Superior, Wisconsin
American male curlers
World curling champions
American curling champions
Curlers at the 1988 Winter Olympics
Curlers at the 1992 Winter Olympics
Olympic curlers of the United States
Wisconsin National Guard personnel
American Lutherans
20th-century Lutherans